Julia Viellehner (6 September 1985 – 22 May 2017) was a German long-distance duathlete and triathlete who competed in long-distance world duathlon and triathlon championships.

Personal life
Viellehner was brought up in a family of athletes in Winhöring, Upper Bavaria. Her father Johann was a summiteer and her mother Irmgard was a keen marathon runner. Julia was appointed into the Bavarian national athletics team and in 2004 won her first German national championship. In 2014, her family were distressed when her brother Raphael and her father disappeared when they went hiking on a mountain tour on Aoraki / Mount Cook in New Zealand. They were never found.

Accident
Viellehner was involved in a traffic accident involving a heavy goods vehicle during a cycling training session. The vehicle overtook her and pulled in sharply, the wheel of the truck caught her bike's front wheel causing her to go under the truck. She suffered severe injuries and was put into a medically induced coma for a week before she died.

References

1985 births
2017 deaths
Sportspeople from Upper Bavaria
German female long-distance runners
German female marathon runners
German female mountain runners
German female triathletes
German national athletics champions
Duathletes
Sport deaths in Italy
People from Bad Tölz-Wolfratshausen